Makin' the Changes is a studio album by saxophonist Jackie McLean. It was recorded in 1957 for Prestige, but not released until 1960 by the subsidiary label New Jazz as NJ 8231. It features three tracks with McLean in a quartet with pianist Mal Waldron, bassist Arthur Phipps and drummer Art Taylor, and three with a sextet featuring trumpeter Webster Young, trombonist Curtis Fuller, pianist Gil Coggins, bassist Paul Chambers and drummer Louis Hayes.

Track listing 
"Bean and the Boys" (Coleman Hawkins a contrafact of  "Lover Come Back to Me") - 8:33
"What's New?" (Bob Haggart, Johnny Burke) - 7:09
"I Never Knew" (Gus Kahn, Ted Fiorito) - 3:00
"I Hear a Rhapsody" (Dick Gasparre, George Fragos, Jack Baker) - 5:08
"Jackie's Ghost" (Ray Draper) - 5:28
"Chasin' the Bird" (Charlie Parker) - 6:35

Recorded on February 15 (#1, 3-4) & August 30 (#2, 5-6), 1957.

Personnel
Tracks 1, 3-4
Jackie McLean - alto sax
Mal Waldron - piano
Arthur Phipps - bass
Art Taylor - drums

Tracks 2, 5-6
Jackie McLean - alto sax
Curtis Fuller - trombone
Webster Young - trumpet
Gil Coggins - piano
Paul Chambers - bass
Louis Hayes - drums

References 

1960 albums
Jackie McLean albums
Albums produced by Bob Weinstock
New Jazz Records albums
Albums recorded at Van Gelder Studio